"For You, For Me, For Evermore" is a song composed by George Gershwin, with lyrics by Ira Gershwin.

Written around 1936-7, it was rediscovered by Ira Gershwin when he was preparing music for The Shocking Miss Pilgrim (1946), where it was introduced by Dick Haymes and Betty Grable.

Notable recordings 
Margaret Whiting - a single release for Capitol Records (catalog No. 294) (1946).
Artie Shaw and His Orchestra (vocal by Mel Tormé) - recorded in July, 1946 for Musicraft Records (catalog No. 412).
Dick Haymes and Judy Garland - a single release for Decca Records (catalog No. 23687). This briefly charted in 1947 in the No. 19 spot.

References

Songs with music by George Gershwin
Songs with lyrics by Ira Gershwin
1946 songs